Faizabad Lok Sabha constituency is one of the 80 Lok Sabha (parliamentary) constituencies in the Indian state of Uttar Pradesh. It includes Ayodhya city And Faizabad city.

Assembly segments
Presently, Faizabad Lok Sabha constituency comprises five Vidhan Sabha (legislative assembly) segments. These are:

Members of Parliament

Election results

See also
 List of Constituencies of the Lok Sabha

Notes

External links
Faizabad lok sabha  constituency election 2019 result

Lok Sabha constituencies in Uttar Pradesh
Faizabad district